Marcus Laurentius Wallenberg, Sr.  (5 March 1864 – 22 July 1943) was a Swedish banker and industrialist. He served as CEO of Stockholms Enskilda Bank (SEB) from 1911 to 1920.

Early life
Wallenberg was born on 5 March 1864 in Stockholm, Sweden, the son of André Oscar Wallenberg and his second wife Anna Wallenberg. He had 13 full siblings, and four half-siblings, including Knut Agathon Wallenberg (1853–1938).

Wallenberg became underlöjtnant in the Swedish Navy in 1882 but left his position the same year at the age of 18 and received a Candidate of Law degree from Uppsala University in 1888. He was appointed Master of Laws with court training in 1890.

Career
In 1890, Wallenberg became ombudsman for Stockholms Enskilda Bank (SEB) and from 1892 belonged to the bank's executive board. In 1892, Marcus's older half brother, Knut Agaton Wallenberg, served as CEO of Stockholms Enskilda Bank and induced Marcus to come work for him as vice president of the bank; an offer Marcus accepted. His older brother retired as CEO in the year of 1911 and Marcus replaced him as CEO. He served as CEO until the year of 1920. Marcus laid the very foundation of the bank for decades with his emphatic defense of his own banking policy and constant emphasis on the importance of family traditions.

In addition, Wallenberg had been so intrigued by the promotion of Swedish industry that his name became intimately connected with its development in the first quarter of the 20th century. During his initiative and participation, several of Sweden's largest industrial facilities have either been founded or reorganized on an economic basis; in addition, he has promoted the achievements of Swedish industry abroad. Along with the Norwegian Sam Eyde, he founded Norsk hydro elektrisk kvælstofsaktieselskab in 1905, whose facilities at Notodden in Norway have been epoch-making for the extraction of nitrogen compounds from the air. Wallenberg was the leading representative in Sweden of the modern pursuit of industry concentration under the leadership of the major banks. His strong interest in industrial development gave him reason to, together with E. J. Ljungberg in 1910, found the Federation of Swedish Industries (Sveriges Industriförbund). A stately testimony to the significance of his efforts in these various fields leaves the Ekonomiska studier, tillägnade Marcus Wallenberg på hans 50-årsdag ("Economic Studies, dedicated to Marcus Wallenberg on his 50th birthday", 1914), a festschrift authored by about thirty collaborators in the field of practical and theoretical economics.

Wallenberg, who was widely used for committee assignments in banking legislation and related matters, was from 1917 a member of the Trade Council (Handelsrådet). During World War I, he was repeatedly called upon to bring about trade agreements with England and its allies. He was thus a member of the Swedish negotiating delegation, which in the autumn of 1916 was sent to London. The agreements, which were now signed on 29 May 1918 with England, France, the United States and Italy and which assured Sweden of the supply of food and other necessities against the leasing of tonnage to the Triple Entente, and the restriction of exports to the Central Powers, were primarily Wallenberg's work. In the winter of 1919, Wallenberg had to monitor Sweden's interests in financial matters on behalf of the Swedish government during the Paris Peace Conference and in 1920 was Sweden's representative at the Brussels Finance Conference.

In 1920 he became a member of the League of Nations' newly established Financial Committee, of which he was chairman from 1921 to 1922. In 1921, Wallenberg founded the Swedish Taxpayers' Association. Wallenberg participated in leading positions in the implementation of the Dawes Plan, and was the sole permanent arbitrator in disputes concerning the interpretation and application of the law, the financial burden on German industry and was a member of the permanent arbitration tribunal for disputes concerning the Dawes Plan application.

Personal life
Wallenberg married Gertrud Amalia Hagdahl on 19 August 1890. The couple had two sons and four daughters; Sonja (1891–1970), Jacob (1892–1980), Andrea (1894–1980), Gertrud (1895–1983), Marcus (1899–1982) and Ebba (1896–1960).

Marcus raised both his sons in a systematic way to prepare them for a career in the family bank. A successful upbringing considering both sons served as CEO of the bank. In 1960, Jacob Wallenberg founded the Marcus and Amalia Wallenberg Foundation in memory of his parents.

Death
Marcus Wallenberg died on 22 July 1943 at the age of 79 at Malmvik Estate in Lindö in Ekerö Municipality.

Ancestry

Awards and decorations

Swedish
  Knight and Commander of the Orders of His Majesty the King (Order of the Seraphim) (17 November 1931)

  Commander Grand Cross of the Order of Vasa (6 June 1923)
  Commander 1st Class of the  Order of Vasa (6 December 1913)
  Commander of the Order of Vasa (24 January 1908)
  Knight 1st Class of the Order of Vasa (1898)

  Commander Grand Cross of the Order of the Polar Star (6 June 1918)
   Knight of the Order of the Polar Star (1903)

Foreign
   Knight Grand Cross of the Order of the Crown of Italy
   Grand Cross of the Order of St. Olav
  Grand Cross of the Decoration of Honour for Services to the Republic of Austria
   Grand Officer of the Legion of Honour
   Third Class of the Order of the Rising Sun

Honours
Member of the Royal Swedish Academy of Sciences (1939)
Honorary member of the Royal Swedish Academy of Engineering Sciences (1920)

References

External links

 

1864 births
1943 deaths
Swedish bankers
Swedish Navy personnel
Uppsala University alumni
Marcus Wallenberg, Sr.
Grand Crosses of the Order of Vasa
Members of the Royal Swedish Academy of Sciences
Members of the Royal Swedish Academy of Engineering Sciences